Ole Lund (born 8 July 1934) is a Norwegian barrister and industrial leader.

He was born in Hammerfest to lawyer Ole Lund (1903–1981) and Hjørdis Stavseth. He graduated as cand.jur. from the University of Oslo in 1959, and was barrister with access to work with the Supreme Court from 1969. From 1975 he was director of the shipping company , and from 1978 to 1986 he was manager of the Nordisk Defence Club. From 1986 he was running his own practice as lawyer, and from 1998 to 2006 he was a partner in the law company . He has been chairman of the board of Oslo Stock Exchange, Bergen Bank, Den norske Bank and Statoil.

References

1934 births
Living people
People from Hammerfest
20th-century Norwegian lawyers
Norwegian industrialists
University of Oslo alumni
21st-century Norwegian lawyers